CECS may refer to:
 Centro de Estudios Científicos (Center for Scientific Studies), a multidisciplinary research centre in Valdivia, Chile
 Canine epileptoid cramping syndrome, a disease affecting dogs, also known as Spike's Disease
 Computers in education and cognitive systems
 The Church of England Children's Society
 Chronic exertional compartment syndrome